The following were mayors of Salisbury, Wiltshire, England:

15th–16th centuries
1387: John Hethe, MP for Salisbury, 1388 
1388,1391: John Moner, MP for Salisbury, 1397 
1395–1397: Richard Spencer, 4 times MP for Salisbury, 1395–1411 
1397: John Moner 
1402: Henry Man, 6 times MP for Salisbury, 1415–1429
1408-9: Walter Shirley
1416–17: Walter Shirley
1418: Robert Poynaunt, MP for Salisbury, 1420 
1426-7: John Noble
1431, 1438: Henry Man 
1487: Richard Bartholomew, MP for Salisbury, 1497, 1512 and 1515 
1491–92: Thomas Coke, 6 times MP for Salisbury between 1489 and 1515 
1507: Richard Bartholomew
1510–11: Thomas Coke
1517: John Abarough, MP for Salisbury, 1515 and 1523 
1520–21: Thomas Brodegate, MP for Salisbury, 1515 
1528: Robert South, MP for Salisbury, 1536 and 1539
1537–38: Henry Coldston, MP for Salisbury, 1539
1545: Robert Griffith, MP for Salisbury, 1554
1547: Thomas Chaffyn, MP for Salisbury, 1555
1558–59: Robert Eyre, MP for Salisbury, 1558 and 1563
1560–61: John Webbe, MP for Salisbury, 1558
1561–62: William Webbe, MP for Salisbury, 1559
1565: Anthony Weekes, MP for Salisbury, 1563
1577: John Bayley, MP for Salisbury, 1589
1584: Robert Bower, MP for Salisbury, 1593 
1592–93: Giles Hutchens, MP for Salisbury, 1593 and 1597

17th century
Source:

1600 Mathew Bee

1601 Henry Byle

1602 Jacob Harvylande

1603 William Eaton

1604 Roger Barnes

1605 Thomas Hancocke

1606 Roger Gauntlett, MP for Salisbury

1607 Bartholomew Tookie

1608 Edward Roades

1609 Richard Gauntlett

1610 Bartholomew Tookie,  MP for Salisbury

1611 Thomas Raye

1612 Laurence Horne

1613 Alexander Alford

1614 Henry Pearson

1615 Richard Godfrey

1616 Robert Maswell

1617 George Churchhouse

1618 John Wendover

1619 William Goodridge

1620 William Ray

1621 Maurice Green

1622 Thomas Sqibb

1623 Robert Jole

1624 Robert Checkford

1625 Wolstan Coward

1626 John Ivie

1627 James Abbot

1628 John Batt

1629 Thomas Hill

1630 Richard Carter

1631 Henry Byley

1632 Mathew Bee

1633 Nicholas Elliot
1634 John Dove, MP for Salisbury

1635 Maurice Bylerigg

1636 Richard Carter

1637 John Ranger or Banger

1638 Thomas Hancock

1639 William Joyce

1640 Richard Gauntlett

1641 Thomas Lawes

1642 Humphry Ditton

1643 Thomas Hancock

1644 Francis Dove

1645 Humphry Ditton

1646 Edward Edmunds

1647 John Ivie

1648 Richard Banks

1649 Francis Dove

1650 Thomas Keynon

1651 Thomas Ovyatt

1652 Thomas Ray jnr.

1653 William Wilson

1654 Wichard Phelps

1655 William Stone

1656 Robert Good

1657 Thomas Cutler

1658  Christopher Batt

1659 Thomas Abbot

1660 Maurice Green

1661 Thomas Gardiner

1662 Thomas Batter

1663 William Wilson

1664 John Joyce

1665 Thomas Williams

1666 Isaac A’Court

1667 William Slanne
1668 William Vyner

1669 Edmund Marke

1670 Ambrose West

1671 Christopher Gardiner

1672 Robert Jones

1673 James Bennett

1674 William Smith

1675 Thomas Keynton

1676 Giles Naish

1677 Oliver Shergold

1678 James Harris

1679 Roger Baskett

1680 John Priaulx

1681 Richard Minefye

1682 Andrew Bauden

1683 William Clements

1684 Thomas Wansborough

1685 Richard Eyre

1685 Christopher Gardiner

1686 Edward Faulkner

1687 George Clement

1688 John Hill

1689 Peter Phelps

1690 Thomas Haskett

1691 John Coleman

1692 Thomas Taylor

1693 John Parsons

1694 John Pain

1695 James Wyatt

1696 Francis Keynton

1697 Richard Long

1698 William Barnes

1699 Richard Hill

18th century

1700 George Flower
1700 William Waterman
1701 Thomas Abbot
1702 Johnathon Newman
1703 James Hayter
1704 Walter Ireland
1705 Henry Long
1706 William Green
1707 Joseph Gifford
1708 William Hillman
1709 John Prater
1710 Thomas Clifton
1711 John King
1712 Richard Marsh
1713 Walter Barry
1714 William Naish
1715 Edward Cornelius
1716 James Blake
1717 Edward Cornelius
1718 James Blake
1719 William Strugnell
1720 Silvester Pope
1721 Richard Spinney
1722 William Batt
1723 James Stone
1724 Johnathon Newman
1725 Henry Bennet
1726 Samuel Case
1727 Thomas Light
1728 Henry Case
1729 John Robbins
1730 George Flower
1731 Thomas Hull
1732 William Ruddel
1733 John Davis
1734 Daniel Floyd
1735 John Biggs
1736 John Hussey
1737 William Smith
1738 John Baker
1739 William Stone
1740 James Case
1741 Richard Samburn
1742 Matthew Pitts
1743 Robert Robbins
1744 John Talk
1745 Thomas Smith
1746 William Forty
1747 Thomas Baker
1748 Samuel Case
1749 John Thorpe
1750 Henry Brown
1751 James Wyatt
1751 John Case
1752 John Wansborough
1753 Nicholas Hicks
1754 Robert Powel
1755 John Maton
1756 Scrope Egerton
1757 John Blake
1758 William Hussey. Clothier and MP
1759 Robert Wentworth
1760 Geoffrey Gowen
1761 William Talk
1762 James Bennett
1763 Edward Lambert
1764 Thomas Dennis
1765 John Gowan
1766 Joseph Wiles
1767 John Cooper, MP
1768 James Rothwell
1769 Sydenham Burrough
1770 Henry Penruddocke Wyndham, MP
1771 Robert Cooper
1772 John Tanner
1773 Rawlins Hillman
1774 John Edgar
1775 William Little
1776 John Elderton
1777 Thomas Hussy
1778 Nathaniel Wick
1779 Edward Eastman
1780 Joseph Hinxman
1781 William Stephens
1782 Nathaniel Still
1783 John Wyche
1784 Thomas Long
1785 James Easton
1786 George Maton
1787 Eadward Hinxman
1788 George Yalden Fort
1789 Henry Hinxman
1790 Michael Burrough from Nov 18 1790 
1791 Robert Freemantle
1792 James Goddard
1793 Thomas Brown
1794 Joseph Tanner
1795 William Boucher
1796 Thomas Goddard
1797 Joseph Tanner
1798 Paul Lagas Burnett
1799 Henry Smith

19th century

1800 William French

1801 Edward Stevens

1802 James Sutton

1803 Joseph Everett

1804 William Ghost

1805 John Pern Tinney

1806 Johnathan Fishlake

1807 Hezekiah Wyche

1808 Thomas Wilkie

1809 James Hussy

1810 John Pinkney

1811 Edward Davies

1812 William Bird Brodie

1813 William Andrews

1814 Charles George Brodie

1815 Rev. Christopher Rigby Collins

1816 William Woolfryes

1817 Henry Emley

1818 John Atkinson

1819 Joseph Tanner

1820 Thomas Webb Dyke

1821 Thomas Wynch

1822 George Atkinson

1823 Joseph Tanner

1824 Thomas Webb Dyke

1825 Thomas Wynch

1826 George Atkinson

1827 Joseph Bouverie Hussy Tanner

1828 Thomas Ogdon Stevens

1829 George Sutton

1830 John Pinkney

1831 William Fawcett

1832 John Beere

1833 John Lush Alford

1834–35 John Cother

1835–36 William Smith

1836–37 Charles Finch

1837–38 Alexander Lucas

1838–39 Richard Hetley

1839–40 Thomas Norwood Chubb

1840–41 Robert Mackrell

1841–42 William Blackmore

1842–43 William Corbin Finch MD

1843–44 James Hussey

1844–45 Edward Edmund Peach Kelsey

1845–46 William Brownjohn

1846–47 George Fulford

1847–48 Robert Farrant

1848–49 Robert Farrant

1849–50 Thomas Robert Moore MD

1850–51 George Brown

1851–52 Edward Edmund Peach Kelsey

1852–53 Edward Edmund Peach Kelsey

1853–54 John Lambert

1854–55 Thomas Pain

1855–56 Abraham Jackson

1856–57 Thomas Pain

1857–58 Coard William Squarey

1858–59 Philip Pickney Cother

1859–60 William Woodlands

1860–61 Philip Watson Ottoway

1861–62 Charles Mann Cornwallis Whatman

1862–63 John Style

1863–64 John Waters

1864–65 Richard Henry Rigden

1865–66 Robert Stokes

1866–67 John Alfred Lush MD

1867–68 Stephen Eldridge

1868–69 William Aylward

1869–70 Charles Richard Norton

1870–71 William Fawcett Jnr.

1871–72 John Harding Jackson

1873–74 Henry Brown

1874–75 Samuel Ralph Atkins

1875–76 Charles Henry Radcliffe

1876–77 John Keynes

1877–78 Richard Monkhouse Wilson

1878–79 Joseph Williams Lovibond

1879–80 William Hicks

1880–81 Edward Frederick Kelsey

1881–82 William Leach

1882–83 Charles Moody

1883–84 Thomas Stephen Futcher

1884–85 George Fulford

1885–86 William Maxwell Hammick

1886–87 Frederick Griffen

1887–88 Edward Waters

1888–89 Samuel Parker

1889–90 George Nodder

1890–91 Joseph Williams Lovibond

1891–92 William Marlow

1892–93 Arthur Whitehead

1893–94 Charles Haskins

1894–95 Edward Foulger Pye Smith

1895–96 Arthur Russell Malden

1896–97 Arthur Whitehead

1897–98 Howard Harris

1898–99 Edward Alexander

1899–1900 David Stevens

20th century

1900–01 Henry George Gregory

1901–02 John Alfred Folliott

1902–03 Edward John Brittan

1903–04 Charles John Woodrow

1904–05 James Keith Dowden

1905–06 Frank Baker

1906–07 Samuel Grove

1907–08 Robert Michael Hall

1908–09 Tom Perkins

1909–10 Richard Arthur Wilson

1910–11 Frank Shepherd

1911–12 William Pritchard

1912–13 Frederick Sutton

1913–14 James Macklin, MP

1914–15 James Macklin, MP

1915–16 James Macklin, MP

1916–17 James Macklin, MP

1917–18 James Macklin, MP

1918–19 James Macklin, MP

1919–20 Howard Lapham

1920–21 Thomas William Berry

1921–22 Edward Sidney Humby

1922-22 Henry Bywater Medway

1922–23 Francis Herbert Wort

1923–24 Reuben Bracher

1924–25 Robert Bousie

1925–26 James Brothers

1926–27 John Cattrell Hudson

1927–28 Edith Maud Hulse (first lady mayor)

1928–29 Alfred Salisbury-Jones

1929–30 Harry Medway

1930–31 Alfred Hinxman

1931–32 John Sidney Rambridge

1932–33 Gideon Hancock

1933–34 Edwin James Case

1934–35 Edward Herbert Major

1935–36 Charles Scammel

1936–37 Maurice Rawlence

1937–38 Charles Thomas

1938–39 William Cornelius Bridge

1939–40 William Cornelius Bridge

1940–41 Gerald Earl Thornton

1941–42 George Albert Berry

1942–43 Sidney Clarke

1943–44 Ernest Railton Grant

1944–45 Alfred Courtney

1945–46 Herbert Barber

1946–47 Fred Sanders

1947–48 Roland Graham Gordon

1948–49 Stanley Narcissus Bigwood

1949–50 Horace Edward Randall

1950–51 Arthur Albert Maidment

1951–52 George Chivers Whatley

1952–53 William James Rothwell

1953–54 Hedley John Annetts

1954–55 Francis James Moore

1955–56 Charles Joseph Lee

1956–57 Edward Percy Adlam

1957–58 Alfred Edward Batt

1958–59 Arthur Albert Maidment

1959–60 William James Rothwell

1960–61 Harold Reginald Kidwell

1961    Arthur Christopher Hoy

1961–62 Stanley Arthur Vokes

1962–63 Harold Gordon Batt

1964–65 Alfred Henry Crane

1965–66 William Eric Glazebrook

1966–67 William Stephen Biddle

1967–68  Beatrice Dorothy Brown

1968–69 Stewart Anthony Snook

1969–70 Margaret Josephine Benson

1970–71 William Hezekiah Lambert

1972–73  Hilda Elizabeth Barker

1973–74 George William Shingler

1974–75 Francis William Grandfield

1975–76 George Hubert Anthony Stocken

1976–77  Timothy Sherwood Hattersley

1977–78 Ivan Cecil Light

1978–79 Arthur Walter James Lawrence

1979–80 Kenneth Anthony Edwards

1980–81 Douglas Anthony Stephenson

1981–82  Derek Ashton Alford

1982–83  Beverly Head

1983–84  Peter John Dalton

1984–85  Pamela Irene Edwards

1985–86  Thomas Cameron Cowie

1986–87 William John Quirke McGrath

1987–88  Elizabeth Margaret Grant

1988–89  Pauline Denise D Stocken

1989–90  Margaret Mary Jackson

1990–91 Kathleen Cooper Joel

1991–92 Gloria Celia Tudhope

1992–93 Dorothy Joan Jones

1993–94 Peter Noel Chubb

1994–95 Patricia Mary Errington Rycroft

1995–96 Richard Terrence Rogers

1996–97 Beryl Mary Jay

1997–98 Paul Sample

1998–99  Olwen Tanner

1999–2000 David McCarthy

21st century

2000–01 Steve Fear
2001–02 Ian Tomes
2002–03 Sue Mallory
2003–04 Bobbie Chettleburgh
2004–05 Jeremy Nettle
2005–06 Patrick Paisey
2006–07 Sheila Warrander
2007–08 Kevin Cardy
2008–09 Iris Evans
2009–10 Bobbie Chettleburgh
2010–11 Brian Dalton
2011–12 John Abbott
2012–13 John Collier
2013–14 Penny Brown
2014–15 Jo Broom
2015–16 Andrew Roberts
2016–17 Derek Brown
2017–18 John Lindley
2018–19 Mike Osment
2019–21 John Walsh
2021–22 Caroline Corbin

References

Salisbury
 
mayors of Salisbury